Tronchón is a town located in the province of Teruel in the autonomous community of Aragon, Spain. The town is near the border with Castellón, a province in the autonomous community of Valencia. It is situated in Teruel’s mountainous area known as Maestrazgo.

Geography 

The town is 1,096 m (3,596 ft) above sea level and is located at  40°37'14.14"N   0°23'53.82"W. It is 71 km (44 mi) away (geographic distance) from the Mediterranean coast.

People 

In 2001 census, the town recorded 103 inhabitants. The town has experienced a continuous reduction of population during the end of the 19th century and the 20th century. In 1910 the town recorded 991 inhabitants, and in 1970 it recorded only 331 inhabitants. During the last decade of the 20th century and the first decade of 21st century the town has received an incoming flow of immigrants from Romania.

Tronchón’s cheese is mentioned twice in the 17th century book Don Quixote, by Miguel de Cervantes. Nowadays the town still produces its old cheese made from sheep and goat milk. Tronchon also used to be an important producer of felt hats. That production halted with the industrialization of the production process.

Currently its economy is based in agriculture and cattle. In recent years tourist activities have also grown in the town.

History 
Tronchón received the status of "town" on June 22, 1272.

References

External links 
Very complete web dedicated to the town and its people (in Spanish)
Peña (young people group) el Desfase
Statistical data of the town
 Tronchón.info
 Turismo Maestrazgo

Municipalities in the Province of Teruel
Maestrazgo